Chak Bedi , is a historical town of Pakpattan a district in Punjab. It is part of Pakpattan Tehsil. It is one of the largest town of Pakpattan District.

Location 

It lies on the Pakpattan-Depalpur Road (Previously Delhi Multan Road) about 57 kilometers (35.00 miles) away from Sahiwal, a Division of Punjab Province.

Geography 
It is located on the Pakpattan-Depalpur road, only 20 km (approx.) from Pakpattan.

References

Populated places in Pakpattan District